Events in the year 2022 in Ecuador.

Incumbents 
President: Guillermo Lasso
Vice President: Alfredo Borrero

Events 

31 January — 1 February - 2022 Ecuador landslides
2 March – Ecuador voted on a United Nations resolution condemning Russia for its invasion of Ukraine.
3 April, 9 May, 18 July, 3 October and 18 November - 2022 Ecuador prison riots

Sport 
 Ecuador at the 2022 Winter Olympics

Deaths 

 31 January – Isabel Robalino, lawyer and politician (b. 1917)
 1 February – Wilfrido Lucero, politician (b. 1935)
 19 February – Álvaro Manzano, conductor (b. 1955)
 18 April – Pedro Pinto Rubianes, politician (b. 1931)
 12 May –Richard Moran Reyes (b. 1991)
 21 May – Tania Tinoco, journalist, author, and television producer (b. 1963)
 13 June – Franklin Anangonó, footballer and manager (b. 1974)
 2 July – Francisco Huerta Montalvo, doctor and politician (b. 1940)

References 

 
Ecuador
Ecuador
2020s in Ecuador
Years of the 21st century in Ecuador